Ronan Hussey is an Irish sportsman.  He plays Gaelic football with his local Sneem club, with the South Kerry divisional team, and formerly with the Kerry county team.

Playing career
Hussey was a member of the South Kerry team which won the Kerry Senior Football Championship three times in succession from 2004 to 2006.  He went on to be a member of the Kerry county panel in 2006 and 2007 for the National Football League and All-Ireland Senior Football Championship.  In 2007, Hussey made two appearances for Kerry, both in the NFL (against Limerick and Fermanagh).  He will be not a member of the Kerry squad for 2008 and will be concentrating on club and divisional football.

References
http://www.breakingnews.ie/archives/2006/0309/sport/cweyidmhqlkf/
http://www.the-kingdom.ie/news/story/?trs=cwgbgbaucw
http://www.kerryman.ie/sport/other-sports/rangers-claim-title-as-champs-feale-southern-discomfort-1221718.html

Year of birth missing (living people)
Living people
Kerry inter-county Gaelic footballers
Sneem Gaelic footballers